Aachen I is an electoral constituency (German: Wahlkreis) represented in the Bundestag. It elects one member via first-past-the-post voting. Under the current constituency numbering system, it is designated as constituency 87. It is located in western North Rhine-Westphalia, comprising the city of Aachen.

Aachen I was created for the inaugural 1949 federal election. Since 2021, it has been represented by Oliver Krischer of the Alliance 90/The Greens.

Geography
Aachen I is located in western North Rhine-Westphalia. As of the 2021 federal election, it comprises the city of Aachen from the Städteregion Aachen.

History
Aachen I was created in 1949, then known as Aachen-Stadt. From 1980 through 2009, it was named Aachen. It acquired its current name in the 2013 election. In the 1949 election, it was North Rhine-Westphalia constituency 1 in the numbering system. In the 1949 through 1961 elections, it was number 60. From 1965 through 1998, it was number 53. From 2002 through 2009, it was number 88. Since the 2013 election, it has been number 87. While its borders have not changed since its creation, the former independent city of Aachen was incorporated into the Städteregion Aachen in 2009.

Members
The constituency was first represented by Helene Weber of the Christian Democratic Union (CDU) from 1949 to 1957, followed by fellow CDU member Franz Meyers until 1961 and Edmund Sinn from 1961 to 1969. Former Minister-President of North Rhine-Westphalia Franz Josef Bach of the CDU served a single term from 1969 to 1972, when the constituency was won by the Social Democratic Party (SPD) candidate Dieter Schinzel. The CDU regained it in 1976 with candidate Hans Stercken, who served until 1994. Future Minister-President of North Rhine-Westphalia and federal CDU leader Armin Laschet then served from 1994 to 1998. Ulla Schmidt of the SPD was elected in 1998 and served three terms. She served as Federal Minister of Health from 2001 to 2009. Rudolf Henke won the constituency for the CDU in 2009, and was re-elected in 2013 and 2017. Oliver Krischer of the Greens was elected in 2021.

Election results

2021 election

2017 election

2013 election

2009 election

References

Federal electoral districts in North Rhine-Westphalia
Aachen
Constituencies established in 1949
1949 establishments in West Germany